David Romero Ellner (died 18 July 2020) was a Honduran journalist, lawyer and politician. He was a Liberal party congressman and formerly mayor of Tegucigalpa. He was director of Radio Globo and Globo TV. He was known for his investigations into corruption in the country.

He died on 18 July 2020, from COVID-19 that he contracted in prison during the COVID-19 pandemic in Honduras. Earlier in 2020, CPJ and 190 other agencies urged world leaders to release all journalists imprisoned for their work due to the threat of incurring COVID-19 in prison.

Convictions
In 2002, Romero Ellner was charged with raping his daughter. On 30 July 2002 he was stripped of his parliamentary immunity and office. In 2004, he pleaded guilty to raping his daughter and was sentenced to ten years in prison. He was released early, and the prosecutor who tried him has accused him of then embarking on a harassment campaign against her and her family, for which he was tried and found guilty on sixteen counts of libel and defamation in 2016. In January 2019, the Honduras Supreme Court upheld a previous conviction of the journalist; he  charged a public prosecutor with corruption in 2016. On March 28, 2019, after exhausting all of his appeals, including the Supreme Court of Honduras and the Inter-American Commission on Human Rights, he was arrested by the National Honduran police in a raid on Radio Globo as he was on the air.

References

Honduran journalists
Male journalists
Honduran rapists
2020 deaths
Liberal Party of Honduras politicians
Honduran politicians convicted of crimes
Deaths from the COVID-19 pandemic in Honduras
Prisoners who died from COVID-19